This Will Destroy You is the second studio album by American avant-rock band This Will Destroy You.  It was released on January 29, 2008, through Magic Bullet Records. The vinyl version of the album was pressed on red, blue and white vinyl and contains a quote from the television series Deadwood ("I may have fucked my life up flatter than hammered shit, but I stand before you today beholden to no human cocksucker") etched around the center label.

In July 2017, a Line Rider track synchronised to the entire album was released on YouTube by Bevibel Harvey, who spent 272 hours over 18 months creating it.

Appearances in popular culture
"Burial on the Presidio Banks" was featured in the final scene of the CSI: Miami episode "Flight Risk".
"They Move on Tracks of Never-Ending Light" was used as part of an NBC introductory film narrated by Tom Brokaw which overviews Canada for the 2010 Winter Olympics, it was also used in the 2012 independent film The Diary of Preston Plummer starring Trevor Morgan. 
"The Mighty Rio Grande" was used prominently throughout the 2011 film Moneyball; in a tribute video by American web-based production company Rooster Teeth to the late Monty Oum, creator of the popular web series RWBY in February 2015; in the 2014 science-fiction film Earth to Echo; in the 2014 film Lone Survivor; in the 2015 film Room; in the 2016 television show Lethal Weapon; and in a Verizon commercial that played during Super Bowl LIII. 
"Villa Del Refugio" was featured in a World War Z scene.

Track listing

Personnel
This Will Destroy You
 Jeremy Galindo - guitar
 Raymond Brown - bass guitar, keyboard
 Chris King - guitar
 Andrew Miller - drums

Additional musicians
 Stephanie McVeigh - cello (tracks 1, 5 and 7)

Production
John Congleton - producer, engineer and mixer
This Will Destroy You - producers
Alan Douches - mastering

References 

2008 debut albums
This Will Destroy You albums
Albums produced by John Congleton